Euthyphro (c. 399–395 BC), by Plato, is a Socratic dialogue whose events occur in the weeks before the trial of Socrates (399 BC), between Socrates and Euthyphro. The dialogue covers subjects such as the meaning of piety and justice. As is common with Plato's earliest dialogues, it ends in aporia.

In this dialogue, Socrates meets Euthyphro at the porch of the archon basileus (the 'king magistrate') at that time. Socrates tells him that he is preparing to go to court against the charges of Meletus on the grounds of impiety. Euthyphro tells Socrates that he is going to court himself to prosecute his father for binding a worker in chains and leaving him to die. This has granted him the ire of his own family who believe his father was in the right. The worker had killed a fellow worker, which they believe exempts his father from liability for leaving him bound in the ditch to starve to death. Since Euthyphro seems assured of himself, Socrates asks him to define piety. His help will clarify Socrates' case in the courtroom. If Socrates is asked to define piety, he can simply rely on Euthyphro's definition. This however leads to the main dilemma of the dialogue when the two cannot come to a satisfactory conclusion. Is something pious because the gods approve of it or do the gods approve of it because it is pious? This aporic ending has led to one of the longest theological and meta-ethical debates in history.

Characters
Socrates, the Athenian philosopher. He questions the nature of piety in this dialogue.
Euthyphro, the Athenian prophet. His father owned land on the island of Naxos. His father's harsh treatment of a paid servant (Thetes under the Solonian Constitution) leads to Euthyphro raising charges against him. According to his own statements in this dialogue, his claims to prophecy and divination were considered a joke to other Athenians. He attempts to provide Socrates with a definition of piety but none are sufficient. It is entirely possible as well that Euthyphro was created by Plato as a literary device. His name in ancient Greek is ironically "straight thinker" or "Mr. Right-mind." A combination of εὐθύς (euthys), which means straight or direct and  φρονέω (phroneô) which means to think or to reason. If Euthyphro and his father were historical people then this places the murder charges brought by Euthyphro and the main actions of this dialogue sometime between 405 BC and 399 BC, when the Athenian settlers were expelled from the Island of Naxos after the defeat at the Battle of Aegospotami.

Background
The dialogue in Euthyphro occurs near the court of the archon basileus (king magistrate), where Socrates and Euthyphro encounter each other; each man is present at the court for the preliminary hearings to possible trials (2a).

Euthyphro has come to present charges of murder against his own father who, after arresting one of his workers (Thetes) for killing a slave from the family estate on Naxos Island, tied him and threw him in a ditch where he died of exposure to the elements (3e–4d) while Euthyphro's father waited to hear from the exegetes (cf. Laws 759d) about how to proceed. Socrates is astonished by Euthyphro's confidence in being able to prosecute his own father for the serious charge of manslaughter, despite the fact that Athenian Law allows only relatives of the dead man to file suit for murder (Dem. 43 §57). Euthyphro dismisses the astonishment of Socrates, which confirms his overconfidence in his own critical judgment of religious and ethical matters.

In an example of Socratic irony, Socrates says that Euthyphro obviously has a clear understanding of what is pious or holy (τὸ ὅσιον to hosion) and impious or unholy (τὸ ἀνόσιον to anosion). Because he is facing a formal charge of impiety, Socrates expresses the hope to learn from Euthyphro, all the better to defend himself in the trial, as he himself is being accused of religious transgressions.

Euthyphro says that what lies behind the charge of impiety presented against Socrates, by Meletus and the others, is Socrates' claim that he is subjected to a daimon (divine sign), which warns him of various courses of action (3b). From the perspective of some Athenians, Socrates expressed skepticism of the accounts about the Greek gods, which he and Euthyphro briefly discuss, before proceeding to the main argument of their dialogue: the definition of "piety". Moreover, Socrates further expresses critical reservations about such divine accounts that emphasize the cruelty and inconsistent behaviour of the Greek gods, such as the castration of the early sky-god Uranus, by his son Cronus; a story Socrates said is difficult to accept (6a–6c).

After claiming to know and be able to tell more astonishing divine stories, Euthyphro spends little time and effort defending the conventional Greek view of the gods. Instead, he is led to the true task at hand, as Socrates forces him to confront his ignorance by pressing Euthyphro for a definition of "piety"; yet, Socrates finds flaw with each definition of "piety" proposed by Euthyphro (6d ff.).

At the dialogue's conclusion, Euthyphro is compelled to admit that each of his definitions of "piety" has failed, but, rather than correct his faulty logic, he says that it is time for him to leave, and excuses himself from their dialogue. To that end, Socrates concludes the dialogue with Socratic irony: Since Euthyphro was unable to define "piety", Euthyphro has failed to teach Socrates about piety. Therefore, from his dialogue with Euthyphro, Socrates received nothing helpful to his defense against a formal charge of impiety (15c ff.).

It is easier to understand Socrates' arguments in this dialogue if the reader keeps in mind that Athenian religion revolved around specific rituals and practices with no reference to sacred scripture, at least in the same sense as later Abrahamic religions. Priests might worship only one specific god while not paying respect to the others. Euthyphro uses Zeus as evidence for his notions of piety while disregarding Uranus and Cronus, for example.

The argument

Socrates asks Euthyphro to offer him a definition of piety or holiness. The purpose of establishing a clear definition is to provide a basis for Euthyphro to teach Socrates the answer to the question: "What is piety?" Ostensibly, the purpose of the dialogue is to provide Socrates with a definitive meaning of "piety", with which he can defend against the charge of impiety in the pending trial.

Socrates seeks a definition of "piety" that is a universal (universally true), against which all actions can be measured to determine whether or not the actions are pious. To be universal, the definition of "piety" must express the 'essence' of the thing defined (piety), a clear and unambiguous standard to which each particular instance of piety will conform.

The dialogue
Ostensibly in order to better defend himself in an upcoming trial for being an impious citizen of Athens, Socrates asks Euthyphro for a clear definition of piety (holiness); he offers Socrates four definitions.

First definition
Euthyphro's first definition of piety is what he is doing now, that is, prosecuting his father for manslaughter (5d). Socrates rejects Euthyphro's definition, because it is not a definition of piety, and is only an example of piety, and does not provide the essential characteristic that makes pious actions pious.

Second definition
Euthyphro's second definition: Piety is what is pleasing to the gods. (6e–7a) Socrates applauds this definition, because it is expressed in a general form, but criticizes it saying that the gods disagree among themselves as to what is pleasing. This means that a given action, disputed by the gods, would be both pious and impious at the same time – a logical impossibility. Euthyphro argues against Socrates' criticism, by noting that not even the gods would disagree, among themselves, that someone who kills without justification should be punished. Yet Socrates argues that disputes would still arise – over just how much justification actually existed; hence, the same action could be pious and impious; again, Euthyphro's definition cannot be a definition of "piety".

Third definition
To overcome Socrates' objection to his second definition of piety, Euthyphro amends his definition. (9e)

Euthyphro's third definition of piety is: "What all the gods love is pious, and what they all hate is impious." In reply, Socrates poses the question that would eventually become known in philosophy as the Euthyphro dilemma: "Is the pious loved by the gods because it is pious? Or is it pious because it is loved by the gods?". Euthyphro seems unsure as to what the question means and so Socrates applies a dialectic technique: an analogy, to clarify his question (10a). He persuades Euthyphro to agree that when we call a thing "carried", it is simply because it is being carried by someone and not because it possesses an inherent characteristic, which could be called "carried". That is, "being carried" is not an essential trait of the thing being carried but a condition, a state that the object is currently in. He then moves to what we call "beloved" (φιλούμενόν filoumenon). Is something "beloved" in and of itself (like being big or red), or does it become beloved when it is loved by someone? Clearly, the answer is again the latter, something becomes beloved when it is loved. So then, continues Socrates, something beloved by the gods (θεοφιλές theofiles) becomes so because it is loved by them, to which Euthyphro agrees and Socrates moves to the conclusion that reveals his contradiction: What is beloved by the gods cannot be pious. Euthyphro seems to be taken aback so Socrates reminds him the definitions he gave previously (10e). He had said that something is loved by the gods because it is pious, which means that their love follows from something inherent in the pious. And yet they just agreed that what is beloved is put in that state as a result of being loved. So piety cannot belong to what is beloved by the gods since according to Euthyphro it does not acquire its characteristics by something (the act of being loved) but has them a priori, in contrast to the things that are beloved that are put in this state through the very act of being loved. It seems therefore that Euthyphro's third argument is flawed.

At that juncture of their dialogue, Euthyphro does not understand what makes his definition of "piety" a circular argument; he agrees with Socrates that the gods like an action because it is pious. Socrates then argues that the unanimous approval of the gods is merely an attribute of "piety", that divine approval is not a defining characteristic of "piety". That divine approval does not define the essence of "piety", does not define what is "piety", does not give an idea of "piety"; therefore, divine approval is not a universal definition of "piety".

Linguistic note
Socrates' argument is convoluted not only because of its structure but because of the language used, and is said to have "reduced translators to babble and driven commentators to despair". The text presents the argument through a distinction between the active and the passive voice, as for example when Socrates asks about the difference between a "carried thing" (φερόμενον) and "being carried" (φέρεται), both using the word "carried" in the English translation.

Fourth definition
In the second half of the dialogue, Socrates suggests a definition of "piety", which is that "piety is a part of justice", but he leads up to that definition with some other observations and questions, starting with:

... Are you not compelled to think that all that is pious is just?

Yet, Socrates later says that the information provided in his question to Euthyphro is insufficient for a clear definition of "piety", because piety belongs to those actions we call just, that is, morally good; however, there are actions, other than pious actions, which we call just (12d); for example, bravery and concern for others. Piety is only a portion of Justice and is not sufficient in giving a clear view of justice. Socrates gives a comparison to even numbers. If a definition of even numbers were provided it would not be suitable to clarify what numbers are because it is only a group of numbers and not the entire thing as a whole. Socrates asks: What is it that makes piety different from other actions that we call just? We cannot say something is true, because we believe it to be true. We must find proof.

Euthyphro's response
In response, Euthyphro says that piety is concerned with looking after the gods (12e), but Socrates objects, saying that "looking after", if used in its ordinary sense (with which Euthyphro agrees) would imply that when one performs an act of piety one thus makes one of the gods better – an example of hubris, a dangerous human emotion frowned upon by the Greek gods. (13c) In turn, Euthyphro responds that "looking after" involves service to others, and Socrates asks: What is the end product of piety? Euthyphro replies with his earlier (third) definition, that: Piety is what is loved by all the gods. (14b).

Final definition
Euthyphro then proposes a fifth definition: "Piety is an art of sacrifice and prayer". He proposes the notion of piety as a form of knowledge, of how to do exchange: Giving gifts to the gods, and asking favours in return. (14e) Socrates presses Euthyphro to say what benefit the gods perceive from human gifts – warning him that "knowledge of exchange" is a type of commerce. (14e) Euthyphro objects that the gifts are not a quid pro quo, between man and deity, but are gifts of "honour, esteem, and favour", from man to deity. (15a) In other words, Euthyphro admits that piety is intimately bound to the likes of the gods. The dialogue has come full circle, and Euthyphro leaves Socrates without a clear definition of "piety" as he faces a trial for impiety (ἀσέβεια asebeia).

History
Fragments of this dialogue exist on a papyrus from the 2nd century. The oldest surviving medieval manuscript was made in 895 by Arethas of Caesarea and copied by Johannes calligraphus.

This dialogue is notable for containing one of the few surviving fragments of the poet Stasinus, a relative of Homer and author of the lost work Cypria. Socrates quotes him to show his disagreement with the poet's notion that fear and reverence are linked. The quoted excerpt is as follows: Of Zeus, the author and creator of all these things,/ You will not tell: for where there is fear there is also reverence.

Reception
In the early 3rd century BC, the Epicurean Metrodorus of Lampsacus wrote a pamphlet titled Against the Euthyphro which is now lost. This is the oldest literary criticism of this dialogue in the ancient world.

Diogenes Laertius listed the dialogue as belonging to the first tetralogy in the 1st century BC. He considered it one of the tentative dialogues and gave On Holiness as an alternate title. He also mentioned that some teachers used it as the first dialogue in their courses meaning that it was in antiquity seen as the most suitable introduction to Plato's works. He also claimed that after the events of this dialogue, Euthyphro was persuaded not to prosecute his father though that is not supported by any of Plato's own writings.

In the surviving fragment of On Plato's Secret Doctrines by Numenius of Apamea he suggests that the character of Euthyphro was entirely fictitious and represented the Athenian popular religion. He reasoned that Plato had to criticize the Athenian religion in dialogue form rather than directly attacking it in order to avoid being executed like Socrates himself.

In the Anonymous Prolegomena to Platonic Philosophy it is stated that the Euthyphro was Plato's first dialogue.

The dialogue returned to obscurity in the Latin speaking scholarly world until it was rediscovered in the Renaissance age. The dialogue was translated into Armenian in the 11th century. The Byzantine scholar Manuel Chrysoloras owned a copy of the Euthyphro. Francesco Filelfo completed the first Latin translation in 1436. Rinuccio da Castiglione completed a second translation a short time later in 1440 though it is considered of lower quality. Marsilio Ficino completed a third in 1484 in Florence in his translated collection of Plato's dialogues. The first edition of the Greek text appeared in Venice in September 1513 by Aldo Manuzio under an edition published by Markos Musuros.

The influential Plato translator Friedrich Schleiermacher did not appreciate this dialogue. He saw it as "a very inferior work compared to Laches and Charmides. Olof Gigon likewise rated it poorly in the 20th century. He felt the dialogue relied too heavily on word games and semantics.

Ulrich von Wilamowitz-Moellendorff approved of the dialogue for separating piety from divine command theory. Michael Erler praised the dialogue for showing reflection on logical and grammatical issues.

One criticism of this dialogue that was raised by Peter Geach is that the dilemma implies you must search for a definition that fits piety rather than work backwards by deciding pious acts (i.e. you must know what piety is before you can list acts which are pious). It also implies something can not be pious if it is only intended to serve the gods without actually fulfilling any useful purpose.

Texts and translations
Greek text at Perseus
Plato: Euthyphro, Apology, Crito, Phaedo, Phaedrus. Greek with translation by Harold N. Fowler. Loeb Classical Library 36. Harvard Univ. Press (originally published 1914).
Fowler translation at Perseus
Plato: Euthyphro, Apology, Crito, Phaedo. Greek with translation by Chris Emlyn-Jones and William Preddy. Loeb Classical Library 36. Harvard Univ. Press, 2017.  HUP listing
Plato. Opera, volume I. Oxford Classical Texts. 
Translated by Woods & Pack, 2007
Bundled with Socrates' Defense (aka Apology), Crito, and the death scene from Phaedo
Translated by Jowett, 1891 at the Classics Archive
G. Theodoridis, 2017: full-text translation
Plato. Complete Works. Hackett, 1997. 
The Last Days of Socrates, translation of Euthyphro, Apology, Crito, Phaedo. Hugh Tredennick, 1954. . Made into a BBC radio play in 1986.

See also
Divine command theory
Euthyphro dilemma
Dialectic
Socratic dialogues

Notes

Further reading

External links

 

Guides to the Socratic Dialogues, a beginner's guide

Works set in the 4th century BC
Dialogues of Plato
Books critical of religion
Philosophy of religion literature
Philosophy of religion